A mercenary is a person primarily concerned with making money at the expense of ethics, most often used to refer to a soldier who fights for hire.

Mercenary or mercenaries may also refer to:

Films and television
 The Mercenaries, also known as Dark of the Sun, a 1968 film starring Rod Taylor
 The Mercenary (film), a 1968 spaghetti western film
 Mercenary (1996 film), a 1996 movie featuring Robert Pine
 Mercenary (2008 film), a 2008 short film starring Billy Lush
 Mercenaries (2011 film), a 2011 British film
 Mercenaries (2014 film), an American action film
 Mercenary (2016 film), a 2016 French film
 The Mercenary, a 2019 American film starring Dominique Vandenberg
 "The Mercenaries" (Mission: Impossible), a 1968 episode from Season 3 of Mission: Impossible

Games
 Mercenary (board game), a board game about conquest set in medieval Europe published by Fantasy Games Unlimited in 1975
 Mercenary (video game), a 1985 computer game by Novagen Software Ltd.
 Mercenary III, a 1992 sequel
 Mercenaries: Playground of Destruction, a 2005 Xbox and PlayStation 2 video game
 Mercenaries (series)
 Mercenaries 2: World in Flames, a 2008 sequel to Mercenaries: Playground of Destruction
 Mercs Inc, a cancelled sequel to Mercenaries 2: World in Flames
 MechWarrior 2: Mercenaries, a 1996 computer game by Activision
 MechWarrior 4: Mercenaries, a 2002 computer game by Cyberlore Studios and FASA Studio

 Traveller Book 4: Mercenary, a rulebook of the Traveller role-playing game series

Literature
 El Mercenario (English: The Mercenary), a 1980–2003 graphic novel by Vicente Segrelles
 The Mercenaries, a 1998 novel by Ed Greenwood

Music
 Mercenary (band), a heavy metal band from Denmark
 Mercenary (album), a 1998 album by the band Bolt Thrower
 "Mercenary", a song by Brave Saint Saturn from the 2008 album Anti-Meridian
 "Mercenary", a song by The Mission from the 1990 album Grains of Sand
 "Mercenary", a song by Panic! at the Disco from the 2012 album Batman: Arkham City – The Album
 "Mercenary", a song by The Go-Go's from the 1984 album Talk Show
 "Mercenaries (Ready For War)", a song by John Cale from the 1979 album Sabotage/Live
 "The Mercenary", a song by Iron Maiden from the 2000 album Brave New World

Sports
 Mercenaries (basketball), a basketball club from Zimbabwe

See also
 The Mercenary (disambiguation)
 Mercenary War
 Marburg Mercenaries, an American football team from Marburg, Germany